Archimantis monstrosa is a species of mantid in the family Mantidae. A. monstrosa, or monster mantis, commonly reaches a length of 90mm or more. It is less common than the often-seen large brown mantis. A. monstrosa that live near the coast can get quite large and sometimes will attack much larger prey.

Identification 
A. monstrosa can be distinguished from A. latistyla in that it only has three spots on the wing covers where A. latistyla has 4; another feature is the spines on the margin of the thorax .

See also
List of mantis genera and species

References

M
Mantodea of Oceania
Insects of Australia
Insects described in 1878
Taxa named by James Wood-Mason